Camil Baciu (born Camillo Kaufman 21 June 1926, Galați – died 22 April 2005, Paris) was a Romanian journalist and science fiction writer. He was a friend of, among others, Iordan Chimet (with whom he was part of an anti-Nazi group) and Gheorghe Ursu. In 1969 he left Romania, settling in Paris.

Bibliography
 "Not Far From The Princess Castle", București, 1956
 "Experience Colombina" , CPSF 126-127, Science and Technology Review, 1960 (2 vol.)
 "Brain Revolt" , Tineretului Publishing House, București, 1962
 "Cubic Planet" , Tineretului Publishing House, București, 1964
 "The Great Law", 1964
 "Met...", Editura Revista Știință și Tehnică, 1964 (2 vol.)
 "The Orange Sun", 1965
 "The Destiny Machine", Tineretului Publishing House, București, 1966
 "Ienicec", 1967
 "The Garden of the Gods", Tineretului Publishing House, București, 1968 (re-published in 2001 at the Romanian Cultural Foundation Publishing House)
 Aragua, novel

References

 Garden Of the Gods scribd.com goodreads.com
 Machine of Destiny scribd.com goodreads.com
 Brain Revolt scribd.com
 The Great Law goodreads.com
 Met... goodreads.com
 Nemira publishing house
 From Social Realism to Science Fiction

Romanian novelists
Jewish Romanian writers
Romanian emigrants to France
People from Galați
1926 births
2005 deaths